Oneworld is an international airline alliance.

Oneworld may also refer to:

 Oneworld Publications, a British independent publishing firm founded in 1986 by Novin Doostdar and Juliet Mabey
 OneWorld.net, a nonprofit web portal about sustainable development and human rights issues around the globe
 Institute for OneWorld Health, a nonprofit pharmaceutical company
 OneWorld, a computer software suite developed by JD Edwards, a company now owned by Oracle Corporation
 OneWorld.press, a Russian start-up opinion platform representing itself as a global think tank.

See also
 One World (disambiguation)
 Our World (disambiguation)